Axel Schandorff (3 March 1925 – 28 January 2016) was a Danish track cyclist. He was born in Copenhagen. He competed for Denmark at the 1948 Summer Olympics held in London, United Kingdom in the individual sprint event where he finished in the bronze medal position.

References

External links
 Axel Schandorff's biography at cyclingstars.dk
 

1925 births
2016 deaths
Danish male cyclists
Olympic cyclists of Denmark
Olympic bronze medalists for Denmark
Cyclists at the 1948 Summer Olympics
Olympic medalists in cycling
Cyclists from Copenhagen
Medalists at the 1948 Summer Olympics